John Winford Byers (22 March 1875 – 22 May 1966) was a Santa Monica architect and builder noted for use of the Spanish Colonial revival style.

Early life
Byers was born in Michigan. Byers, a graduate from Harvard University, was employed as a schoolteacher, teaching Spanish and French, at San Rafael High School and Santa Monica High School. Self-trained as a builder and architect, Byers completed his first commission, a house at 510 Lincoln Boulevard for W.F. Barnum, the principal of the Santa Monica High School in 1916.

Importance
Byers designed and built dozens of homes in Brentwood, Pacific Palisades, and Santa Monica from 1916 through 1946. He was fascinated with the native California architecture and its Mexican and Spanish roots. He was most notable for his "Adobe" designed buildings, having written several articles in the 1920s and 1930s on adobe construction and its influence in California architect. He studied the native building traditions of Hispanic cultures and went through a phase where he built houses of adobe and stucco. He established his own workshop, employing Mexican craftsmen who were masters at creating and installing the adobe brick, the decorative tile, wrought iron and woodwork that he used in his houses.

Some projects

Other dwellings were constructed in Coachella, Victorville, Bel Air, and Beverly Hills. Byers also constructed an adobe memorial recreation hall (Miles Playhouse) in Santa Monica, a clubhouse at Brentwood Park, and a building at the John Thomas Dye School.

He was also responsible for the adobe wall surrounding the landmarked Pascual Marquez Family Cemetery in Santa Monica Canyon.

Family life
When John Byers died in Santa Monica, at the age of 91 in 1966, he was based out of this Spanish Colonial Revival compound at 246 26th Street. Byers and his family lived in the house at 2034 La Mesa Drive for almost thirty years.

References

 Andre, Herb, "John Byers: Domestic Architecture in Southern California 1919-1960," M.A. thesis, University of California, Santa Barbara, 1971

Historicist architects
1872 births
1966 deaths
Artists from Santa Monica, California
Architects from Los Angeles
California people in design
Harvard University alumni
Place of birth missing
20th-century American architects